Jut (also Romanized as Jūt) is a village in Takht Rural District, Takht District, Bandar Abbas County, Hormozgan Province, Iran. At the 2006 census, its population was 12, in 4 families.

References 

Populated places in Bandar Abbas County